Splendrillia hermata is a species of sea snail, a marine gastropod mollusk in the family Drilliidae.

Description
The length of the shell attains 18 mm, its diameter 6 mm.

Distribution
This marine species is endemic to New Zealand and occurs off Otago to Chatham Rise at a depth of 180 metres

References

 Dell, Richard Kenneth. The archibenthal mollusca of New Zealand. Dominion Museum, 1956.
 Powell, A.W.B. 1979: New Zealand Mollusca: Marine, Land and Freshwater Shells, Collins, Auckland

External links
 
  Tucker, J.K. 2004 Catalog of recent and fossil turrids (Mollusca: Gastropoda). Zootaxa 682:1–1295.

hermata
Gastropods of New Zealand
Gastropods described in 1956